The 5th Moscow International Film Festival was held from 5 to 20 July 1967. The Grand Prix was shared between the Soviet film The Journalist, directed by Sergei Gerasimov and the Hungarian film Father, directed by István Szabó. The festival line-up included the film Spellbound Wood, directed by Norodom Sihanouk, the former King of Cambodia.

Jury
 Sergei Yutkevich (USSR - President of the Jury)
 Román Viñoly Barreto (Argentina)
 Aleksey Batalov (USSR)
 Lucyna Winnicka (Poland)
 Todor Dinov (Bulgaria)
 Hagamasa Kawakita (Japan)
 Leslie Caron (France)
 András Kovács (Hungary)
 Grigori Kozintsev (USSR)
 Robert Hossein (France)
 Jiří Sequens (Czechoslovakia)
 Dimitri Tiomkin (USA)
 Andrew Thorndike (East Germany)
 Leonardo Fioravanti (Italy)

Films in competition
The following films were selected for the main competition:

Awards
 Grand Prix:
 The Journalist by Sergei Gerasimov
 Father by István Szabó
 Special Golden Prize: Detour by Grisha Ostrovski and Todor Stoyanov
 Golden Prize: No Stars in the Jungle by Armando Robles Godoy
 Special Silver Prize: Romance for Bugle by Otakar Vávra
 Silver Prizes:
 Westerplatte by Stanisław Różewicz
 Treasure of San Gennaro by Dino Risi
 The Great White Tower by Satsuo Yamamoto
 The Climber by Vladan Slijepčević
 Prizes:
 Best Actor: Paul Scofield for A Man for All Seasons
 Best Actress: Sandy Dennis for Up the Down Staircase
 Best Actress: Grynet Molvig for The Princess
 Special Mention: Fred Zinnemann for A Man for All Seasons
 Prix FIPRESCI: Detour by Grisha Ostrovski and Todor Stoyanov

References

External links
Moscow International Film Festival: 1967 at Internet Movie Database

1967
1967 film festivals
1967 in the Soviet Union
1967 in Moscow